Stefano Maccoppi (born 21 April 1962) is a retired Italian football defender and later manager. Since January 2023, he is the manager of AC Bellinzona, playing in the Swiss Challenge League.

References

1962 births
Living people
Italian footballers
Serie A players
Serie B players
Como 1907 players
A.S. Sambenedettese players
A.C. Ancona players
S.S.C. Bari players
Piacenza Calcio 1919 players
Association football defenders
Italian football managers

AC Bellinzona managers
FC La Chaux-de-Fonds managers
Yverdon-Sport FC managers
Neuchâtel Xamax FCS non-playing staff
FC Locarno managers
FC Sion non-playing staff
CSM Ceahlăul Piatra Neamț managers

Sliema Wanderers F.C. managers
FC Chiasso managers
Expatriate football managers in Switzerland
Expatriate football managers in Romania
Expatriate football managers in Malta
Italian expatriate sportspeople in Switzerland
Italian expatriate sportspeople in the Democratic Republic of the Congo
Italian expatriate sportspeople in Romania
Italian expatriate sportspeople in Malta